We Bought a Zoo is a book published in 2008 by Benjamin Mee about his experiences in purchasing the Dartmoor Wildlife Park in Devon, England in 2006. Renamed the Dartmoor Zoological Park, it was reopened to the public the following year.

The book was loosely adapted into a film of the same name that was released in 2011.

The book was published by HarperCollins.

References

2008 non-fiction books
Autobiographies adapted into films
British autobiographies
Devon
English non-fiction books